Four South Australian Railways L class broad-gauge locomotives with a  wheel arrangement were built by Beyer, Peacock and Company in 1879 and entered service in March–April 1880. They were condemned in 1928 and 1931, and were subsequently scrapped.

Need
In the early days of the South Australian Railways (SAR), in a climate of scarce funds and political interference, the need for new motive power often had to become urgent before new locomotives were ordered. In the late 1870s, several locomotives in poor condition were due to be condemned. Many of the remaining locomotives were too light for the rapidly increasing traffic on the line between the state capital, Adelaide, and its waterfront at Port Adelaide.

Design

William Thow, who had been appointed Locomotive Engineer of the SAR in 1876, prepared specifications for a new class of side-tank locomotives to work on the Port Line. Beyer, Peacock and Company, of Manchester, was awarded the contract to build four of them. They were constructed in 1879 and arrived in South Australia on 23 February 1880 on board the 1,447-ton clipper Rodney. Immediately after the first two locomotives entered service, on 19 March 1880, it became apparent that the weight on the four driving wheels was too much for the lightly constructed track and bridges, and it was inevitable that the locomotives would have to be reconfigured with tenders, allowing the side tanks (with their water load) and coal bunker to be removed from the locomotive.

Urgent rebuild

After some disagreement with Beyer, Peacock and Company, Thow placed an order for six-wheeled tenders with their rivals, Dübs and Company of Glasgow, where in his early career he had been a draftsman. Before the tenders arrived, others were commandeered from condemned locomotives. Conversion to the final configuration took place between November 1880 and February 1881; the axle load on the four driving wheels was reduced by 2 tons or 16 per cent.

The L class colour scheme was blue-black with glittering brass and copper fitments. Before 1920, the locomotives were kept in immaculate condition, but afterwards they were recorded as being dirty, neglected and unkempt.

Deployment
Ironically, the L class tender locomotives did not return to the Port Line but were deployed to the North Line as far as Riverton; and when heavier rail was laid further north, to the start of the narrow gauge at Terowie. They also saw service between Roseworthy and Kapunda. Then in 1883, when the line through the Adelaide Hills to Nairne was opened as part of the Adelaide to Nairne section of the Intercolonial Railway,  they operated on that line. By 1914 they were working more on secondary duties, including as pilot locomotives on the hilly Main South Line, and hauling mixed trains on the line to Pinnaroo and other lines east of Murray Bridge. Late in their service lives, they worked on the Dry Creek–Port Adelaide line, transferring freight trains between Port Adelaide and the Dry Creek railway yards. 

All four L class locomotives were rebuilt between 1894 and 1901, and three were condemned in 1931 (no. 41 had received an additional rebuild in 1914 and was condemned in 1928). They were scrapped by 1934.

Notes

References

Broad gauge locomotives in Australia
L
Beyer, Peacock locomotives
4-4-0T locomotives
4-4-0 locomotives
Railway locomotives introduced in 1880